Kimora: Life in the Fab Lane is an American reality  television series on the Style Network. The series premiered on August 5, 2007. The series ran on syndication on E! but is no longer aired.

A spin-off show, Kimora: House of Fab, debuted on January 23, 2013.

Synopsis
The series follows Kimora Lee Simmons and features the daily life of herself, her three children: Ming Lee Simmons (January 2000), Aoki Lee Simmons (August 2002), and Kenzo Lee Hounsou (May 2009), along with various people who work for and with Simmons. Along with giving viewers an insight to her daily life, her boyfriend Djimon Hounsou is also shown. Her first husband, Russell Simmons, makes frequent appearances in the series too.

Episodes

Season 1: 2007

Season 2: 2008

Season 3: 2009-2010

Season 4: 2011

References

External links
 
 http://www.tvguide.com/tvshows/kimora-life-fab-lane/289957

2000s American reality television series
2010s American reality television series
2007 American television series debuts
2011 American television series endings
English-language television shows
Style Network original programming
E! original programming